Edward Hatoum (Arabic: إدوارد حاطوم) (born December 7, 1947) is a Lebanese-born Canadian former professional ice hockey forward. He played in the National Hockey League between 1968 and 1971, and the World Hockey Association between 1972 an 1974.

Playing career
Hatoum was reunited with his family in Ottawa, Ontario, in 1957 and began playing hockey after a few years living in the nation's capital.

The first player born in Lebanon to play in the NHL, Hatoum started his National Hockey League career with the Detroit Red Wings. He would also play with the Vancouver Canucks. His career would last from 1969 to 1971. He would also play with the Chicago Cougars and Vancouver Blazers of the World Hockey Association.

Post-playing career
After retiring from hockey (and coaching the Nelson Maple Leafs), Hatoum worked in the auto-body business in Ottawa and more recently auto wholesale in Vancouver.

Career statistics

Regular season and playoffs

 All statistics taken from NHL.com

References

External links 
 

1947 births
Living people
Baltimore Clippers players
Canadian ice hockey right wingers
Chicago Cougars players
Detroit Red Wings players
Fort Worth Wings players
Hamilton Red Wings (OHA) players
Ice hockey people from Ottawa
Lebanese emigrants to Canada
Rochester Americans players
San Diego Gulls (WHL) players
Seattle Totems (WHL) players
Sportspeople from Beirut
Vancouver Blazers players
Vancouver Canucks players
Western International Hockey League players
Sportspeople of Lebanese descent